Tosti may refer to:

Antonella Tosti, Italian dermatologist
Luigi Tosti (1811 - 1897), Neapolitan-Italian historian
Paolo Tosti (1846 – 1916), British-Italian composer and music teacher
Croque monsieur, a hot grilled sandwich in the Netherlands